The 1965 Australia Cup Final was the fourth Australia Cup Final, the final match of the 1965 Australia Cup. It was played at Sydney Showground in Sydney, Australia, on 24 November 1965, contested by Sydney Hakoah and APIA Leichhardt. Hakoah won a replay match 2–1, with one goal each from David Reid and Herbert Ninaus after a 1–1 draw (13–13 on penalties)

Route to the final

Sydney Hakoah

APIA Leichhardt

Match

Details

Final

Replay

References

November 1965 sports events in Australia
Soccer in Sydney
Australia Cup (1962–1968) finals